Brian Ross, also known as Brian Smith (born 1954) is an English vocalist, who is best known as the frontman of heavy metal bands Satan, from 1983 to 1984, in 2004, and since 2011, and Blitzkrieg, from 1980 to 1981, from 1984 to 1991, from 1992 to 1994, from 1996 to 1999, and since 2001. He also performs as Alice Cooper in Alice Cooper's Nightmare, a tribute show in United Kingdom.

Ross's son, Alan Ross, has been the guitarist of Blitzkrieg since 2012, as well as providing backing vocals on the album Back From Hell.

Discography

With Satan 
Court in the Act (1983)
Live in the Act (2004)
Life Sentence (2013)
Trail of Fire: Live in North America (2014)
Atom by Atom (2015)
Cruel Magic (2018)
Earth Infernal (2022)

With Blitzkrieg 
A Time of Changes (1985)
Unholy Trinity (1995)
Ten (1996)
The Mists of Avalon (1998)
Absolute Power (2002)
Sins and Greed (2005)
Theatre of the Damned (2007)
Back From Hell (2013)
A Time of Changes: 30th Anniversary Edition (2015)
Judge Not! (2018)

References 

Living people
20th-century English singers
21st-century English singers
English heavy metal singers
English rock singers
Musicians from County Durham
1954 births